Dean DeLeo (born August 23, 1961) is an American guitarist known for his work with rock band Stone Temple Pilots. DeLeo is also known for his role in the short-lived bands Talk Show and Army of Anyone. He is the older brother of Robert DeLeo, who plays bass for Stone Temple Pilots.

DeLeo's playing has received strong critical acclaim over the years. Stone Temple Pilots' second album, Purple, released in 1994, was ranked at #73 on Guitar Worlds 100 Greatest Guitar Albums of All-time list.

Early life 
DeLeo and his younger brother Robert were both born in New Jersey and raised in the Jersey Shore community of Point Pleasant Beach. They are the younger half-brothers of late actor Scott Marlowe.

Career

Stone Temple Pilots (1985–2003, 2008–present) 
Dean's younger brother Robert met future vocalist Scott Weiland at a Black Flag concert. Robert soon after introduced Dean to Scott and an idea of forming a band was brought up. Dean was a guitarist and Robert managed to convince him to join. They eventually hooked up with drummer Eric Kretz, and the band was formed. They took the name Mighty Joe Young, inspired by the movie of the same name. They played gigs in many bars around San Diego and the Hollywood area, and eventually landed a record deal with Atlantic Records in 1992. However, they were forced to change their name, as the name "Mighty Joe Young" had already been taken by a blues musician. Weiland decided on the name "Stone Temple Pilots"; although he stated that it has no real meaning, he just liked the initials "STP".

The band quickly rose to fame with the release of their debut album Core, which sold over 8 million copies. The record sales were propelled by the release of the singles "Sex Type Thing" and "Plush", and helped establish Stone Temple Pilots as one of the many popular grunge bands in the early 1990s. However, they were ripped by critics for jumping on the bandwagon and profiting from the grunge mania.  With their second album Purple, they challenged critics and became a genuine commercial rock act. Stone Temple Pilots went on to record five studio albums and managed to sell over 30 million copies worldwide.  In 2008, after over five years apart, the band reunited. On  May 25, 2010, the band released their sixth album, Stone Temple Pilots, the first album released after the band reunited.

Talk Show, Army of Anyone and other work (1997–present) 
The DeLeos and Eric Kretz formed a new band, Talk Show, which released one album. DeLeo worked with Laughter Train in the late 1990s. Stone Temple Pilots soon  released two more albums, and disbanded once again in 2002. Weiland became the lead singer of Velvet Revolver, Kretz opened a studio in California, and the DeLeo brothers began to work with Richard Patrick, lead singer of the band Filter to compose songs for Filter's fourth album. The end result was a song that the three liked, so they contacted Ray Luzier, a famed session drummer, and Army of Anyone was formed. The band's debut was released on November 14, 2006, and they broke up in May 2007.

In 2021, he teamed up with Tom Bukovac for a new project, Trip The Witch. Debut single "Saturn We Miss You" features Jon Anderson on vocals.

Production work 
DeLeo and his younger brother Robert produced Stone Temple Pilots' 2010 album, Stone Temple Pilots. The DeLeo brothers also produced the album TruANT by Alien Ant Farm.

Equipment and style 
DeLeo owns numerous guitars, and he is an avid collector of vintage guitars. Some of his more notable guitars include:
Three 1978 Les Paul Standards
1960's Fender Telecaster
A Sunburst Telecaster
A PRS hollowbody electric by PRS Guitars
A Gibson J-45
'57 Les Paul Special with P-90's in TV Yellow
Gibson J-100 XT

DeLeo's live equipment has been described as "simple yet effective", and allows him to replicate the sounds he gets in studios. He primarily uses a modified Dunlop Cry Baby and a BOSS CE-1 stereo chorus pedal. For a number of years his rig was switched via a Rockman midi pedal, has since been replaced by a RJM Mastermind midi pedal.

DeLeo also uses an S.I.B. Varidrive pedal for overdrive and distortion.

A detailed gear diagram of DeLeo's 2007 guitar rig is well-documented.

References 

1961 births
Living people
Lead guitarists
American rock guitarists
Grunge musicians
People from Montclair, New Jersey
People from Point Pleasant Beach, New Jersey
Guitarists from New Jersey
Stone Temple Pilots members
American people of Italian descent
Slide guitarists
American male guitarists
20th-century American musicians
21st-century American musicians
Musicians from the New York metropolitan area
20th-century American guitarists
Talk Show (band) members
Army of Anyone members